Samuel Laman Blanchard (15 May 1804 – 15 February 1845) was a British author and journalist.

Life
The son of a painter and glazier, he was born at Great Yarmouth. He was educated at St Olave's school, Southwark, and then became clerk to a proctor in Doctors' Commons. At an early age he developed an interest in literature, contributing dramatic sketches to a paper called Drama. For a short time he belonged to a travelling theatre company, but then became a proof-reader in London, and wrote for the Monthly Magazine. In 1827 he was made secretary of the Zoological Society, a post he held for three years.

Over-work broke down his strength and, after his wife died in December 1844 of a painful illness, Blanchard entered a depression from which he never recovered. He committed suicide with a razor, and was buried at West Norwood Cemetery.

Works
In 1828 he published Lyric Offerings, dedicated to Charles Lamb. He had a very varied journalistic experience, editing in succession the Monthly Magazine, the True Sun, the Constitutional, the Court Journal, the Courier, and George Cruikshank's Omnibus; and from 1841 until his death he was connected with the Examiner.

In 1846 Edward Bulwer-Lytton collected some of his prose-essays under the title Sketches of Life, to which a memoir of the author was prefixed. His verse was collected in 1876 by William Blanchard Jerrold.

Family
His eldest son was Sidney Laman Blanchard, the author of Yesterday and To-day in India.

References

Further reading
 ''West Norwood Cemetery The Dickens Connection', Friends of West Norwood Cemetery, 1995

External links

 

1804 births
1845 deaths
English male poets
English essayists
English male journalists
People educated at St Olave's Grammar School
Burials at West Norwood Cemetery
Suicides by sharp instrument in England
People from Great Yarmouth
1840s suicides